Kim Jong-suk (born 1931) is a North Korean government official. She is the chairwoman of the Committee for Cultural Relations with Foreign Countries. In 2017, she was appointed to the Diplomatic Commission of the Supreme People's Assembly. She is a former editor-in-chief of the newspaper Minju Choson.

References

People from Pyongyang
1931 births
Living people
21st-century North Korean women politicians
21st-century North Korean politicians
Date of birth missing (living people)
Women government ministers of North Korea